The Miskolc Experience is the title of a double live album by Therion. It was released in Europe in June 2009. Unlike their other live albums this doesn't only feature the band's original material, but also Therion covering various pieces from classical artists. It was recorded at the 2007 Miskolc Opera Festival.

Track listing

DVD Content

Live concert
 Clavicula Nox
 Dvořák: Excerpt from Symphony No. 9
 Verdi: 'Vedi! Le fosche notturne spoglie' from Il trovatore
 Mozart: 'Dies Irae' from Requiem
 Saint-Saëns: Excerpt from Symphony No. 3
 Wagner: 'Notung! Notung! Neidliches Schwert!' from The Ring
 Wagner: Excerpt from the Overture from Rienzi
 Wagner: Second Part of 'Der Tag ist da' from Rienzi
 Wagner: First Part of 'Herbei! Herbei!' from Rienzi
 The Blood of Kingu
 Sirius B
 Lemuria
 Eternal Return
 Draconian Trilogy
 Schwarzalbenheim
 Via Nocturna
 The Rise of Sodom and Gomorrah
 Grand Finale

Bonus features
 Documentary
 Therion Goes Classic - Bucharest 2006

The Live Show CDs were mastered by Maor Appelbaum

Charts

References

External links
 Information about the album at the official website

2009 live albums
Therion (band) live albums
Live video albums
Nuclear Blast video albums
Nuclear Blast live albums
2009 video albums